Euphorbia intisy is a species of plant in the family Euphorbiaceae. It is endemic to Madagascar.  Its natural habitat is subtropical or tropical dry forests. It is threatened by habitat loss.

See also
Madagascar spiny forests ecoregion

References

intisy
Endemic flora of Madagascar
Flora of the Madagascar spiny thickets
Least concern plants
Taxonomy articles created by Polbot